The Council for the Mathematical Sciences (CMS) is an organisation that represents all types of British mathematicians at a national level. It is not a professional institution, but a collaboration of them.

History
It was established in 2001 by the Institute of Mathematics and its Applications, the London Mathematical Society and the Royal Statistical Society to provide a forum for mathematics.

Purpose
 to represent the interests of mathematics to government, Research Councils and other public bodies;
 to promote good practice in the mathematics curriculum and its teaching and learning at all levels and in all sectors of education;
 to respond coherently and effectively to proposals from government and other public bodies which may affect the mathematical community;
 to work with other bodies such as the Joint Mathematical Council and HoDoMS.

Structure
It is situated off the A4200 in Russell Square, next to the University of London in the offices of the London Mathematical Society. It is accessed via the Russell Square tube station on the Piccadilly Line.

References

External links
 Web site

2001 establishments in the United Kingdom
Learned societies of the United Kingdom
Mathematics education in the United Kingdom
Mathematical societies
Organisations based in the London Borough of Camden
Organizations established in 2001
Mathematical Sciences
Royal Statistical Society